Frederick Harris Merriman (18 May 1873 – 27 June 1940) was a British tug of war competitor who competed in the 1908 Summer Olympics. He was part of the British team, which won the gold medal in the tug of war competition.

References

External links
profile

1873 births
1940 deaths
City of London Police officers
Tug of war competitors at the 1908 Summer Olympics
Olympic tug of war competitors of Great Britain
English Olympic medallists
Olympic gold medallists for Great Britain
Olympic medalists in tug of war
Medalists at the 1908 Summer Olympics